Pilgramgasse is a station on the Vienna U-Bahn line U4. It is located in Margareten between Ramperstorffergasse and the eponymous street, which is named after Franz Anton Pilgram (1699–1761), an Austrian Baroque architect. The station is in an open cut parallel to the River Wien and curves to match the curve of the river.

History
The station originally opened in 1899 as part of the Vienna Valley line (Wientallinie) of the Vienna Stadtbahn. With the rest of the Stadtbahn network, it was closed in 1918 and reopened in 1925 after electrification. It was served by the WD (Wiental) line until the 1970s. Conversion to a U-Bahn station began on 27 October 1980.

The station has two side platforms. At the Pilgramgasse end, it is accessed via the restored Otto Wagner building, which has stairs. There is access via lift at the Ramperstorffergasse end, where a new building was constructed in 1996 during a programme of renovations by Wiener Linien to improve accessibility, because the Otto Wagner building is protected and so could not have a lift built into it. The lifts opened for service on 8 November 1996.

Between 3 February 2019 and 31 January 2020, the station was closed for reconstruction, related to U2 line extension to Matzleinsdorfer Platz.

References

Buildings and structures in Margareten
Railway stations opened in 1899
Vienna U-Bahn stations
Otto Wagner buildings
Art Nouveau architecture in Vienna
Art Nouveau railway stations
Railway stations closed in 1918
Railway stations opened in 1925
1899 establishments in Austria
1925 establishments in Austria
Railway stations in Austria opened in the 19th century
Railway stations in Austria opened in the 20th century